Komi mythology is the traditional mythology of the Komi peoples of northern Russia.

Gods and spirits

En (Ен) - "Strength". The good creator god, and the enemy of Kul. He took the form of a swan.
Kul' or Omöl' (Куль or Омӧль) - "Weakness". A god of water and of the dead, and the evil creator god. He took the form of a grebe.
Vasa (Васа) - Another water spirit. Like Kul, he could be malicious and had to be appeased by throwing bread, a stick, cakes or tobacco into the water. He was the friend of millers.
Olys' or Olysya (Олысь or Олыся) - A hearth spirit, the equivalent of the Russian domovoi. Under the name Rynyshsa (Рынышса) he is a water spirit associated with baths, appearing as a little hunchbacked old man with a white beard.
Aika (Айка) - "Father" or "Parent". A spirit who protects a specific place. They became enemies of Stephen of Perm.
Peludi-Aika (Пелуди-Айка) - "Father Cornflower". A spirit who forbade peasants to leave the house on 20 July. If they disobeyed, their corn was ravaged.
Pyvsyan'sa (Пывсяньса) - Master of the bath-house, the equivalent of the Russian bannik. He appears as a little man in a red hat with fiery eyes.
Voipel' (Войпель) - God of the cold north wind and of the night. His name means "North/Midnight Wind".
Vörsa (Вöрса) - Spirit of the forest, the equivalent of the Russian leshy. Each forest has its own Vörsa. Hunters offered furs, bread and salt or tobacco to him in the hope he would help them catch game.

Creation myth
A duck egg gave birth to En and Omöl, the spirits of good and evil respectively. En took the form of a swan, Omöl that of a grebe. They rose from the bottom of the primordial ocean to create the world.

Soul
In Komi religious belief the human soul (лов, "lov") had a double (орт, "ort", or орд, "ord"). The ort is born with each human being and gives a premonition of death either to the person who is to die or to one of their family.

Underworld
The land of the dead was usually thought to be far to the north of the living, beyond mountains, rivers and forests. The Komi equivalent of the Styx (the river of the underworld in Greek mythology) was "Syr Yu" (Сыр Ю), "River of Pitch". Dead souls were assigned various means of crossing the river, according to their sins in this world: an iron bridge, a shaky beam, a thin pole or a cobweb. After this the dead had to climb a huge slippery mountain. This was only possible if the person had led a good life and had strong fingernails. Traditionally, the Komis kept their fingernail clippings so they could be buried with them for use in the afterlife.

Shamans and sorcerers
The Komis had shamans and believed in sorcerers and witches. The most notorious witch in Komi folklore is Yoma (or Yoma-Baba).

Video games 
 Black Book
 The Mooseman

See also 
 Finnic mythology
 Permian bronze casts
 Slavic mythology

References

Further reading

 Avril, Yves. Parlons komi. Harmattan, 2006. pp. 142-147.
 Coates, J. G. “Shomvukva. A Komi Folk-Tale”. In: Folklore 77, no. 4 (1966): 257–63. http://www.jstor.org/stable/1258668.
 Konakov, Nikolay. "Rationality and mythological foundations of calendar symbols of the ancient Komi". In: Shamanism and Northern Ecology. Edited by Juha Pentikäinen. Berlin, New York: De Gruyter, 2011 [1996]. pp. 135-142. https://doi.org/10.1515/9783110811674.135
 Konakov, N. D. "Komi Mythology". In: Encyclopaedia of Uralic Mythologies. Akadémai Kiadó, 1999.
 Kuznetsov, Nikolai. "Komi Folklore. Collected by Paul Ariste". In: Folklore vol. 29 (2005): 191-196. doi:10.7592/FEJF2005.29.komi

 Misharina, Galina. "Funeral and Magical Rituals among the Komi". In: Folklore vol. 47 (2011): 155-172. doi:10.7592/FEJF2011.47.misharina
 Pantiukhin, Dmitri Aleksandrovich (2012). "The Komi-Permiak Prollaver Feast Day with the Bykoboi [Bull-Slaughter] Rite". In: Anthropology & Archeology of Eurasia, 51:2, 8-40. DOI: 10.2753/AAE1061-1959510201
 Podyukov, Ivan A. "О НЕКОТОРЫХ ОСОБЕННОСТЯХ КОМИ-ПЕРМЯЦКОЙ ХРОНОНИМИКИ" [ABOUT SOME PECULIARITIES OF KOMI-PERMYAK CHRONONYMICS]. In: Philological Studies Vol. 15, No 2 (2017): 47-55. (In Russian)
 Teryukov, Alexander. "Materials on Komi-Zyryan mythology: Notions of the soul". In: Shamanism and Northern Ecology. Edited by Juha Pentikäinen. Berlin, New York: De Gruyter, 2011 [1996]. pp. 143-150. https://doi.org/10.1515/9783110811674.143
 Филимонов, В. В. (2014). Фольклор и верования народа коми в «Известиях Архангельского общества изучения русского Севера» [FOLKLORE AND BELIEFS OF THE KOMI PEOPLE IN “PROCEEDINGS OF THE ARKHANGELSK SOCIETY FOR THE STUDY OF THE RUSSIAN NORTH”]. Вестник Северного (Арктического) федерального университета. Серия: Гуманитарные и социальные науки, (1), 88-94. URL: https://cyberleninka.ru/article/n/folklor-i-verovaniya-naroda-komi-v-izvestiyah-arhangelskogo-obschestva-izucheniya-russkogo-severa (дата обращения: 04.08.2022).

Uralic mythology